Fellows of the Royal Society elected in 1817.

Fellows

 John Baillie (1772–1833)
 Edward Bromhead (1789–1855), mathematician
 William Burroughs (d. 1829), barrister
 George Byng, 6th Viscount Torrington (1768–1831)
 Joseph Constantine Carpue (1764–1846), surgeon
 Frederick Sylvester North Douglas (1791–1819), MP
 Robert Saunders Dundas, 2nd Viscount Melville (1771–1851)
 Hugh Fortescue, 2nd Earl Fortescue (1783–1861)
 Augustus Bozzi Granville (1783–1872), physician, writer
 Edward Hanmer (1758–1821)
 James Rawlins Johnson (d. 1840)
 William Lambton (1756–1823), surveyor
 Thomas Legh (1793–1857), MP
 John William Mackie (b. c. 1788), Chaplain to Duke of York
 William Macmichael (1784–1839), physician
 John Maddy (1766–1853)
 Macvey Napier (1776–1847), legal scholar
 Gore Ouseley (1770–1844), diplomat
 Henry John Peachey, 3rd Baron Selsey (1787–1838)
 William Henry Francis Petre, 11th Baron Petre (1793–1850)
 Thomas Stamford Bingley Raffles (1781–1826), founder of Singapore
 John Reeves (1774–1856), naturalist
 William Somerville (1771–1860), physician
 William Strutt (1756–1830), inventor
 Peter Evan Turnbull (1786–1852)
 John Ashley Warre (1787–1860)

References

1817 in science
1817
1817 in the United Kingdom